The 2019 Nicky Rackard Cup is the 15th staging of the Nicky Rackard Cup hurling championship since its establishment by the Gaelic Athletic Association in 2005. It is the fourth tier of senior inter-county hurling as of 2019.

The competition began on Saturday 11 May 2019 and ends on Saturday 22 June 2019.

Donegal were the 2018 champions and were promoted to the 2019 Christy Ring Cup as a result of the restructuring of the All-Ireland Senior Hurling Championship.

Sligo were crowned champions after defeating Armagh in the final. Sligo's victory completed back to back championship triumphs and promotion from the fifth tier to the third by winning the 2018 Lory Meagher Cup and the 2019 Nicky Rackard Cup.

Team changes

To Championship 
Relegated from the Christy Ring Cup

 Armagh
 Mayo

Promoted from the Lory Meagher Cup

 Sligo

From Championship 
Promoted to the Christy Ring Cup

 Donegal

Relegated to the Lory Meagher Cup

 Leitrim

Competition format

In 2018 the Nicky Rackard Cup changed to an initial stage of one group of four teams and one group of three teams. Previously it was a double elimination tournament. In 2019 the group stage returned to two groups of four teams.

The top two teams in the two groups advance to the knockout semi-finals. The winners of the 2019 Nicky Rackard Cup are promoted to the 2020 Christy Ring Cup. One team will be relegated from the 2019 Christy Ring Cup to the 2020 Nicky Rackard Cup.

The bottom teams from each group playoff in a relegation match with the losers playing in the 2020 Lory Meagher Cup. They are replaced by the winners of the 2019 Lory Meagher Cup.

Teams
8 teams competed in the 2019 Nicky Rackard Cup

Leinster (2): Longford, Louth

Connacht (2): Mayo, Sligo

Ulster (3): Armagh, Monaghan, Tyrone

Britain (1): Warwickshire

Group stage

Group 1

Group 1 Table

Group 1 Rounds 1 to 3

Group 1 Round 1

Group 1 Round 2

Group 1 Round 3

Group 2

Group 2 Table

Group 2 Rounds 1 to 3

Group 2 Round 1

Group 2 Round 2

Group 2 Round 3

Knockout stage

Bracket

Semi-finals

The Group 1 winners play the Group 2 runners-up and the Group 2 winners play the Group 1 runners-up.

Final

The semi-final winners met in the Nicky Rackard Cup final at Croke Park with the winners being promoted to the Christy Ring Cup for 2020.

Armagh will remain in the Nicky Rackard Cup. Silgo are promoted and will now play in the 2020 Christy Ring Cup

Relegation playoff

The bottom teams in each group meet in a relegation playoff.

Monaghan remain in the 2020 Nicky Rackard Cup and Louth are relegated to the 2020 Lory Meagher Cup.

References

Nicky Rackard Cup
Nicky Rackard Cup